Jalan Reko or Jalan Bandar Baru Bangi (Selangor state route B17) is a major road in Selangor, Malaysia.

List of junctions

Roads in Selangor